NPR-1 may refer to:
 NPR-1, the original designation of PWS-35 Ogar aircraft
 Naval Petroleum Reserve No. 1, the former name of Elk Hills Oil Field